Güvenç may refer to:

People with the given name
 Güvenç Kurtar (born 1950), Turkish football manager
 Guwanç Nurmuhammedow (born 1976), judoka from Turkmenistan

People with the surname
 Bahar Güvenç (born 1997), Turkish footballer
 Celalettin Güvenç (born 1959), Turkish politician
 Cenk Güvenç (born 1991), Turkish footballer
 Emrullah Güvenç (born 1987), Turkish footballer
 Günay Güvenç (born 1991), Turkish footballer
 Nejla Güvenç (born 1969), Turkish fashion designer
 Serdal Güvenç (born 1984), Turkish footballer
 Sıtkı Güvenç (1961–2023), Turkish politician
 Tuğba Güvenç (born 1994), Turkish middle-distance runner
 Ziya Burhanettin Güvenç, professor of Physics at Çankaya University, Turkey

Places
 Güvenç, Karaisalı, a village in Karaisalı district of Adana Province, Turkey
 Güvenç, Kazan, a village in Kazan district of Ankara Province, Turkey

Turkish-language surnames
Turkish masculine given names